Kotwica is a Polish surname. Notable people with the surname include:

 Ben Kotwica (born 1974), American football coach
 Petri Kotwica (born 1964), Finnish film director and screenwriter

Polish-language surnames